Ang Dalawang Mrs. Real (International title: The Other Mrs. Reals / ) is a 2014 Philippine television drama romance series broadcast by GMA Network. Directed by Andoy Ranay, it stars Dingdong Dantes, Lovi Poe and Maricel Soriano. It premiered on June 2, 2014 on the network's Telebabad line up replacing Rhodora X. The series concluded on September 19, 2014 with a total of 80 episodes. It was replaced by Hiram na Alaala in its timeslot.

The series is streaming online on YouTube.

Premise
Anthony Real, the husband of Millet meets Shiela who he will eventually marry. Caught in a bigamous relationship, Anthony's wives will eventually find out the truth that they aren't Anthony's only wife which will lead to repercussions into their lives.

Cast and characters

Lead cast
 Dingdong Dantes as Juan Antonio "Anthony" V. Real III
 Lovi Poe as Sheila Salazar-Real
 Maricel Soriano as Carmelita "Millet" Gonzales-Real

Supporting cast
 Robert Arevalo as Henry Gonzales
 Celeste Legaspi as Aurora Gonzales
 Tommy Abuel as Justino "Tino" Salazar, Sheila's father
 Alessandra De Rossi as Sandy A. Dumlao
 Jaime Fabregas as Juan Antonio "Jun" Real II
 Susan Africa as Salome "Umeng" Salazar
 Dominic Roco as Daniel "Dado" Salazar
 Rodjun Cruz as Allan V. Real
 Marc Abaya as Vincent Dumlao
 Marc Justine Alvarez as Juan Antonio "Tonton" Real IV / San Jose
 Coney Reyes as Sonia Villanueva-Real

Recurring cast
 Diva Montelaba as Liza P. Salazar
 Ashley Cabrera as Abby Delos Reyes
 Marco Alcaraz as Edgar Cruz
 Aicelle Santos as Mae

Guest cast
 Frances Makil-Ignacio as Marife D. Salazar
 Ina Feleo as Lydia San Jose
 Dolly de Leon as Felisa San Jose
 Fonz Deza as Gusting Salazar
 Angie Ferro as Rosa Salazar
 Menggie Cobarrubias as Isabelo Delos Reyes
 Robert Seña as Jimmy

Ratings
According to AGB Nielsen Philippines' Mega Manila household television ratings, the pilot episode of Ang Dalawang Mrs. Real earned an 18.5% rating. While the final episode scored a 26.8% rating, which is the series' highest rating.

Accolades

References

External links
 
 

2014 Philippine television series debuts
2014 Philippine television series endings
Filipino-language television shows
GMA Network drama series
Philippine crime television series
Philippine romance television series
Television shows set in Cebu
Television shows set in Quezon City